"Twisted" is a song written and recorded by British act Wayne G featuring Stewart Who?. It was released as a single in 1997 and peaked at number 19 on the Australian ARIA Singles Chart and was certified gold.

Track listings 
 UK Vinyl single
 "Twisted" (6am Warriors Mix)
 "Twisted" (Accapella)
 "Twisted" (Truelove's Lectrolux Mix)
 "Twisted" (Instrumental)

 Australian CD single (665731 2)
 "Twisted" (Betty Ford Radio Edit) - 3:47
 "Twisted" (Do You Fuck As Good As You Dance Edit) - 3:00
 "Twisted" (6am Warriors Mix) - 7:50
 "Twisted" (Danny Tenaglia Club Mix) - 10:50
 "Twisted" (Sharp Remix) - 8:08

Charts

Weekly charts

Year-end charts

Certifications

References 

1997 songs
1997 debut singles